Prorenone (developmental code name SC-23133) is a steroidal antimineralocorticoid of the spirolactone group related to spironolactone that was never marketed. It is the lactonic form of prorenoic acid (prorenoate), and prorenoate potassium (SC-23992), the potassium salt of prorenoic acid, also exists. Prorenoate potassium is about 8 times more potent than spironolactone as an antimineralocorticoid in animals, and it may act as a prodrug to prorenone. In addition to the mineralocorticoid receptor, prorenone also binds to the glucocorticoid, androgen, and progesterone receptors. The antiandrogenic potency of prorenone in vivo in animals is close to that of spironolactone. Similarly to spironolactone, prorenone is also a potent inhibitor of aldosterone biosynthesis.

Chemistry

Synthesis
Prorenone can be synthesized via a Johnson–Corey–Chaykovsky reaction by reaction of canrenone with trimethylsulfonium iodide and sodium hydride.

See also
 Canrenone
 Mexrenone
 Prorenoate potassium
 Prorenoic acid
 Potassium canrenoate

References

Antiandrogens
Antimineralocorticoids
Cyclopropanes
Pregnanes
Progestogens
Spiro compounds
Spirolactones
Steroidal antiandrogens